Qamesh Aghol (also Romanized as Qamesh Āghol; also known as Aḩdāqeh, Ajaga, Ājdāgheh, Azhdaga, Qamesh Āghel, Qamīsh Āghol, and Qeshlāq Qamīsh Āghūl) is a village in Zolbin Rural District, Yamchi District, Marand County, East Azerbaijan Province, Iran. At the 2006 census, its population was 833, in 200 families.

References 

Populated places in Marand County